Jack Fox may refer to:

Jack Fox (actor) (born 1985), English actor
Jack Fox (American football) (born 1996), American football player
Jack Fox (baseball) (1885–1963), American professional baseball player
Tiger Jack Fox (1907–1954), American light heavyweight boxer
J. G. Fox (1916–1980), known as Jack, American nuclear physicist
Jack Foxx, a pen name of Bill Pronzini (born 1943), American writer of detective fiction